Dublin is a town in Pulaski County, Virginia, United States. The population was 2,534 at the 2010 census. It is part of the Blacksburg–Christiansburg Metropolitan Statistical Area. 

The town was named after Dublin in Ireland. A local legend says that the town was named after New Dublin Presbyterian Church, which was in turn named after Dublin, Ireland.

It is the site of the Volvo Group Trucks Operations New River Valley Cab and Vehicle Assembly plant, and the KORONA Candles Inc. factory. The New River Valley Regional Jail is located in Dublin, Virginia, and serves the counties of Bland, Carroll, Floyd, Giles, Grayson, Pulaski, Wythe, and the City of Radford, VA.

History
Back Creek Farm, Belle-Hampton, Dublin Historic District, Fairview District Home, Haven B. Howe House, New Dublin Presbyterian Church, Rockwood, and Spring Dale are listed on the National Register of Historic Places.

Geography
Dublin is located at  (37.103114, −80.684702).

According to the United States Census Bureau, the town has a total area of 1.4  square miles (3.7  km2), all of which is land.

Economy
The Volvo Trucks North America plant in Dublin is the largest Volvo truck plant in the world, currently employing close to 3,000 people and building multiple models of heavy-duty trucks. The Dublin plant will begin manufacturing a battery-powered VNR Electric truck model starting in early 2021.

Demographics

As of the census of 2000, there were 2,288 people, 911 households, and 538 families living in the town. .

Population density was 1,607.1 people per square mile (622.1/km2). There were 969 housing units at an average density of 680.6 per square mile (263.5/km2). The racial makeup of the town was 88.85% White, 8.57% African American, 0.22% Native American, 0.31% Asian, 0.48% from other races, and 1.57% from two or more races. Hispanic or Latino of any race were 0.66% of the population.

There were 911 households, out of which 25.8% had children under the age of 18 living with them, 40.4% were married couples living together, 13.9% had a female householder with no husband present, and 40.9% were non-families. 37.5% of all households were made up of individuals, and 13.3% had someone living alone who was 65 years of age or older. The average household size was 2.13 and the average family size was 2.79.

In the town, the population was spread out, with 18.3% under the age of 18, 12.8% from 18 to 24, 34.1% from 25 to 44, 21.7% from 45 to 64, and 13.2% who were 65 years of age or older. The median age was 34 years. For every 100 females, there were 108.8 males. For every 100 females age 18 and over, there were 107.3 males.

The median income for a household in the town was $27,831, and the median income for a family was $37,100. Males had a median income of $30,417 versus $23,936 for females. The per capita income for the town was $18,224. About 16.5% of families and 18.5% of the population were below the poverty line, including 30.0% of those under age 18 and 12.1% of those age 65 or over.  Dublin is central to Claytor Lake, Radford, and Pulaski.

Notable people
 Jim Brillheart, Major League Baseball pitcher
 Gary Clark, four-time Pro Bowl wide receiver for Washington Redskins (1985–1992) Phoenix Cardinals (1993–1994) and Miami Dolphins (1995)
 Shayne Graham, Cincinnati Bengals kicker.
 Jeff King, tight end for the Carolina Panthers and Arizona Cardinals (2006–2012)
 Ikey 'Banjo' Robinson, early jazz banjoist and singer

See also
 List of Irish place names in other countries
 New River Community College

References

External links
 Claytor Lake Online Website
 Dublin Community Website

Irish-American culture in Virginia
Towns in Pulaski County, Virginia
Towns in Virginia
Blacksburg–Christiansburg metropolitan area
U.S. Route 11